Pallarenda is a northern coastal suburb of Townsville in the City of Townsville, Queensland, Australia. In the  Pallarenda had a population of 791 people.

Geography
The residential development in the suburb is only three streets deep from the beach and is surrounded by undeveloped land. It is accessed by the Cape Pallarenda Road which runs north along the coast from Rowes Bay. In the north of Pallarenda is the Cape Pallarenda Conservation Park.

History 
The suburb was officially named and bounded on 12 June 1992, having previously been known as Cape Marlow. It is believed the name Pallarenda was given by naval officer George Poynter Heath in 1864, possibly from castaway James Morrill who lived with local Aboriginal people.

In the  Pallarenda had a population of 791 people.

Heritage listings
Pallarenda has a number of sites on the Queensland Heritage Register, including:
 Environmental Park: Cape Pallarenda Quarantine Station

Facilities

Pallarenda has a boat ramp that provides direct access to the beach, and a permanent marine stinger enclosure, both in Pallarenda Park. To the south of Pallarenda there is a horse exercise beach and a dog off-leash area. There are a number of picnic and barbecue areas throughout the suburb.

Some of the features include:
rolling green parklands
off-leash dog walking area (Beach Access 11)
play gyms
walking tracks
kitesurfing lessons (Beach Access 15)
kiteboarding from beach access 14-18
swimming
stand-up paddle surfing
kayaking
Waterfront accommodation & caravan park (Rowes Bay)
boat ramp up to 3 tonne
free electric BBQs
only classic wood BBQs left in Townsville
estuary fishing- 3 Mile Creek
miles of pristine beaches
views to Magnetic Island
Townsville Town Common Nature Reserve
old Fort "Pill Box" gun placement
pots for family BBQs or picnics with shaded kiosks and raised areas under huge paperbarks
basketball half court
toilets and showers at beach access points that are maintained daily by council staff.
beach volleyball

References

External links
 

Suburbs of Townsville